Tây Yên Tử  is a township (Thị trấn) of Sơn Động District, Bắc Giang Province in north-eastern Vietnam.

References

Populated places in Bắc Giang province
Communes of Bắc Giang province
Townships in Vietnam